The second season of the TV Land original sitcom Hot in Cleveland premiered on January 19 and ended on August 31, 2011. Twenty episodes were initially ordered, but the order was later extended to 22 episodes. The series stars Valerie Bertinelli, Wendie Malick, Jane Leeves, and Betty White.

After being on hiatus since March 23, 2011, Hot in Cleveland returned on June 15, 2011, to air the remaining 12 episodes of season 2 ending on August 31, 2011.

Plot
The second season picks up 24 hours after the storm and Elka's arrest on hiding stolen property. While in jail, Elka reveals that her late husband was involved with a crime family after she recognizes a fellow inmate named Diane. But that isn't the only revelation coming from Elka, for it turns out that she also had a tryst with Rick, the neighbor and The Plain Dealer columnist who tried to seduce Melanie in the first season. In addition, Max's son is running for political office and Elka realises that dating Max could affect his chances because he doesn't want the publicity, so she breaks up with Max. Because of these events, Elka could face more legal problems, prompting her lawyer to suggest that she be declared incompetent so she won't stand trial, which proves to be a disaster because her lawyer becomes a chick magnet for Melanie, Joy and Victoria. Max dates and prepares to marry another woman, but Elka fights back and both Elka and Max became a couple again. However, Elka's romantic problems take on a lot more problems when Max decides to leave for Florida and asks her to come with him. After deliberating on it, she agrees, but when she sees his shrine to his late wife, she concludes that Max is not ready to marry again and consequently breaks things off with him for good, returning home to face her trial with the support of the girls. She is later found guilty and flees the house to avoid her sentencing, leaving a goodbye note for the girls.

Meanwhile, Joy learns that her son has decided to not see her just yet, but that's the least of her problems: She just learned that the INS plans to deport her back to England, so she must find a way to get a green card... which is where Rick comes in. Although she does accept his offer of "marriage" (knowing that Rick still plans to be a "player"), this unusual relationship and Rick's plan to use this ruse to bed other women would be ruined when Rick tried to smooth talk their immigration lawyer. On top of that, she tells Elka after being arrested by Pete for taking money in a rummage sale drug deal (she sold a guy Victoria's "chill pills") that she was a shoplifter as a teenager. Her love life also takes a weird turn when she finds out a guy she thought was into her really just wants Joy to babysit his son while he dates a different woman, which gives Joy the idea of wanting to have another child. She also had a past relationship with actor Michael E. Knight, whom she despises because he never called after a one-night stand she had with him. This revelation and the fake wedding could also mean more problems for the eyebrow specialist and her attempts to stay in the United States. But thanks to a last-minute deal from the governor's wife, oddly after she accused Joy of being a hooker during Elka's trial, Joy is given a green card to stay in the country, and negotiates for Elka to be cleared of all charges as well once she is brought home from masquerading as a nun in the west.

During a panic situation where the girls are scared about a criminal whom Victoria wooed under Joy's name possibly breaking into their house, Joy accidentally shoots a man by tossing Elka's gun; which is loaded and instantly shoots the leg of the man, who turns out to be her long-lost son, Owen, to whom she reluctantly introduces herself. At first, Owen wants nothing to do with Joy based on her crazy life, but he eventually relents and the two build up a mother-son relationship. As Joy mulls over her options to conceive at a fertility clinic, she ends up having casual sex with Rick, who turns out to be a sperm donor at the clinic. When Melanie finds out about this, she urges Joy to end it with Rick.

Melanie, on the other hand, can't forgive her cop-boyfriend Pete for arresting Elka, but the two do kiss and make up, although his mother has made it known that she does not like Melanie. To add insult to injury, Melanie also finds out that Hank, the married plumber she met back in the first season, is Pete's older brother and still has feelings for her. Elka blurts out information on Melanie's past exploits with Hank at a bar, which simultaneously ends Melanie's relationship with Pete while costing Hank his marriage after his wife witnessed it all. She later finds another guy, a doctor named Aaron. In addition, Melanie visits her home in Los Angeles as it is locked up in legal limbo, and pines for the good days she and her family had in that residence. She is finally able to sell the home while realizing she must move on.

Financial problems are also taking a toll on Victoria, who has just learned that her financial advisor was arrested on embezzlement charges and as a result, is now broke and has her assets frozen, leaving her trying to get herself out of debt and hopefully keep her sanity. An example of that comes when she shows up at a bar with a very old billionaire, but he collapses during their first night out and demands to be taken home. In addition, she learns at a movie audition that she will be playing Melanie Griffith's mother, which results in the two having a cat fight (that is caught on tape), and later manages to land a job on All My Children alongside rival actress Susan Lucci in the wake of Victoria winning a Daytime Emmy award over Lucci in the first season. Unfortunately, Lucci seeks revenge by screwing with Victoria during their scenes together, which is thwarted by Joy threatening to sue the producers. She finally lands a regular job as a feature reporter at a local news station, despite the role initially being a bad fit for her.

Whilst discussing hooking up with friends with no strings attached, Elka starts a casual fling with an old friend, Fred, but she falls in love with him as the relationship quickly becomes serious and decides to propose to him. She changes her mind, but when Fred falls down a well and is subsequently rescued, he then asks Elka to marry him. The season finale revolves around Elka trying to find a sign from her late husband that it is okay to marry Fred, while Joy and Victoria learn that they married each other in Canada during an alcohol-induced stupor on the night of Elka's bachelorette party. But on the day of the wedding, Elka is shocked when not only Max arrives to stop the wedding, but also another man named Bobby proclaims that neither Max nor Fred can marry her, as he is her "dead" husband, leaving the season on a cliffhanger.

Cast

Main
 Valerie Bertinelli as Melanie Moretti
 Jane Leeves as Rejoyla "Joy" Scroggs
 Wendie Malick as Victoria Chase
 Betty White as Elka Ostrovsky

Recurring
 David Starzyk as Pete
 Wayne Knight as Rick
 Carl Reiner as Max
 Buck Henry as Fred

Special guest stars
 Mary Tyler Moore as Diane
 Bonnie Franklin as Agnieszka
 John Schneider as Hank
 Sherri Shepherd as Judge Lesser
 Melanie Griffith as herself
 Jack Wagner as Dr. Aaron Everett
 Susan Lucci as herself
 Michael E. Knight as himself
 Jimmy Kimmel as himself
 Peri Gilpin as Taylor
 Darnell Williams as himself
 Charlie Adler as Director
 Jon Lovitz as Artie, the Opera Guy
 Amy Sedaris as Heather
 George Wendt as Yoder
 Monica Horan as Sarah
 John Mahoney as Roy
 Steve Lawrence as Jack
 Doris Roberts as Lydia
 Jennifer Love Hewitt as Emmy Chase
 Huey Lewis as Johnny Revere
 Cedric the Entertainer as Reverend Boyce
 Don Rickles as Bobby

Guest stars
 Charlie Adler as Director
 Janet Varney as Ellen
 Julie Lancaste as Linda
 Robert Towers as Winston
 Mark Deklin as Kirk Stark
 Millicent Martin as Agnes Bratford
 Leslie Grossman as Elise
 Max Greenfield as Steve
 John Ducey as Gordon
 Arden Myrin as Jasmine Breeze
 Isaiah Mustafa as Kevin
 Dan Bakkedahl as Jasper
 Gregory Harrison as Dave
 Mandy June Turpin as Doreen
 Caitlin Carmichael as Annabelle
 Stephen Dunham as Abner
 Mark Derwin as Gary
 Michael McMillian as Owen
 Frank Caliendo as Kenny
 Patrick Fabian as Richard
 Richard Burgi as Timothy
 Tom McGowan as Robert
 Mindy Cohn as Cassie
 Antonio Sabato Jr. as Leandro
 Lex Medlin as Elliot
 Michael Dunn as Matthew
 Mason Cook as Austin
 James Patrick Stuart as Colin Cooper
 George Newbern as Bill
 Bart Johnson as Mark
 Shelli Boone as Lori

Production
On July 7, 2010, TV Land announced that the show was renewed for a second season, which began production of 20 episodes on November 1, 2010. The new season premiered on January 19, 2011, and had a mid-season finale on March 23, 2011. The second half of the season, consisting of 10 episodes began airing on June 22, 2011. On May 16, 2011, it was announced that two more episodes were then added to the season, bringing the season 2 episode order to 22 episodes.

Mary Tyler Moore guest starred in the season opener, in which her character is somewhat connected with Elka in the wake of the latter's arrest in the first-season finale. This marked the first time since 1977 that both White and Moore worked together since The Mary Tyler Moore Show ended its run on CBS. Sherri Shepherd appeared as the judge in Elka's competency case. Melanie Griffith, Jack Wagner, Bonnie Franklin and Janet Varney also guest starred, Franklin reuniting with One Day at a Time co-star Valerie Bertinelli. John Schneider, David Starzyk, Carl Reiner and Wayne Knight also reprised their roles this season.

The guest stars for the second half of season two are: Buck Henry, Dick Van Patten, John Mahoney (reuniting with Frasier co-star Jane Leeves), Doris Roberts, Jennifer Love Hewitt, George Wendt, Mindy Cohn, Richard Burgi, Antonio Sabàto Jr. and Michael McMillian. Amy Sedaris and Huey Lewis also reprised their roles from previous episodes.

Release
Region 2 released Part 1 of the second season on August 31, 2011, Part 1 features the first 10 episodes of the season. Part 2 which features the rest of the 12 episodes was scheduled to be released on DVD on November 19, 2012, along with a Complete Season 2 box-set with all episodes of Season 2 released on the same date, but got delayed to December 31, 2012, and then again to February 25, 2013.

Episodes

References

General references 
 
 
 

2011 American television seasons
Hot in Cleveland seasons